Edward Payson (July 25, 1783October 22, 1827) was an American Congregational preacher. He was born at Rindge, New Hampshire, where his father, Rev. Seth Payson (1758–1820), was pastor of the Congregational Church. His uncle, Phillips Payson (1736–1801), pastor of a church in Chelsea, Massachusetts, was a physicist and astronomer.

Edward Payson graduated from Harvard College in 1803, was then principal of a school at Portland, Maine, and in 1807 became junior pastor of the Congregational Church at Portland, where he remained, after 1811, as senior pastor, until his death on October 22, 1827. Archibald Alexander suggested in 1844 that "no man in our country has left behind him a higher character for eminent piety than the Rev. Edward Payson."

The most complete collection of his sermons, with a memoir by Asa Cummings originally published in 1828, is the Memoir, Select Thoughts and Sermons of the late Rev. Edward Payson (3 vols., Portland, 1846; Philadelphia, 1859). Based on this is the volume, Mementos of Edward Payson (New York, 1873), by the Rev. E. L. Janes of the Methodist Episcopal Church.

Personal life
Edward was the father of Elizabeth Prentiss.

References

Attribution:

External links
 Edward Payson at Enrichment Journal
 The Complete works of Edward Payson, D.D., vol. 1
 The Complete works of Edward Payson, D.D., vol. 2
 A memoir of the Rev. Edward Payson, D.D., late of Portland, Maine (1830)

1783 births
1827 deaths
People from Rindge, New Hampshire
Harvard College alumni
American religious leaders
Clergy from Portland, Maine
American Congregationalist ministers
American school principals
American evangelicals
Educators from Portland, Maine
19th-century American educators